is a Japanese actress. She is represented with Flying Box.

Biography
Ono was scouted by her former agency during elementary school, and during her first year of junior high school she appeared in a television advertisement for the Coca-Cola Company's Fanta called "3-nen S-gumi: Kurohige-sensei", but when her original office was subsequently closed, her activities were paused. Before graduating from junior high school she was invited by a model who was her mother's friend, and later came back to the entertainment industry.

Ono moved to Now Fashion Agency in 2008, and started working as a model. She later moved to its sister company in 2009, and started working as an actress. This broadens Ono's range of activities in the theatre, films and television dramas.

In 2009, she was selected as one of the winners of the Actor's Seminar Awards Audition, produced by the Japan Film and Television Producer Association, among sixty applicants.

In 14 March 2012, Ono announced that she married actor Nao Ōmori.

In 2013, she made her first television drama appearance in the Fuji Television series Saikou no Rikon. In 2014, Ono made her first leading drama role in Tenchu: Yami no Shioki Hito on the same network.

Her special skill is baton twirling. Ono's hobbies are reading, watching films and dancing.

Filmography

Stage

TV series

Films

Short films

Advertisements

Mobile dramas

Magazines

References

External links
 

Actresses from Tokyo
Japanese film actresses
Japanese stage actresses
Japanese television actresses
1989 births
Living people
21st-century Japanese actresses